François J. Castaing (born 18 March 1945 in Marseille) is an automotive executive with Renault, American Motors, and Chrysler. He is an engineering graduate from École Nationale Supérieure d'Arts et Métiers in Paris, and worked in Europe for Gordini and Renault before being named vice president for Product Engineering and Development at American Motors Corporation (AMC).

With Gordini and Renault
Castaing started his career in motorsports with Gordini in 1968 by working on engines for the 24 Hours of Le Mans races. After Gordini had been taken over by Renault, he advanced to the position of Renault Sport Technical Director. His record of accomplishment with Renault included stints as a member of a racing-engine development team and as director of racing programs. He had joined AMC from Renault, which owned 46% of the company. He and his family moved to Detroit, Michigan in 1980.

With AMC and Chrysler

Castaing was responsible for product engineering and development at AMC. He was instrumental in the development of the downsized Jeep Cherokee, a sport utility vehicle (SUV) that became very profitable for AMC and thereby instigated what would become the modern SUV era. As AMC's vice president for Product Engineering and Development, he also designed a new development approach in which teams of engineers focused on a single type of car platform, working on new models as a system from concept to production. The automaker was looking for a way to speed up its product development process to compete better against its larger competitors in 1985. This differed from the traditional automotive practice of organizing work around departments (such as project planning, design, engineering, manufacturing, and marketing) and components (such as engine, powertrain, and body).
 
This business process is now known as product lifecycle management (PLM). After introducing its compact Jeep Cherokee (XJ), AMC began development of a new model, that later came out as the Jeep Grand Cherokee. The first part in its quest for faster product development was computer-aided design (CAD) software system that makes engineers more productive. The second part in this effort was the new communication system that allowed conflicts to be resolved faster, as well as reducing costly engineering changes because all drawings and documents were in a central database. The product data management was so effective, that after AMC was purchased by Chrysler, the system was expanded throughout the enterprise connecting everyone involved in designing and building products. While an early adopter of PLM technology, Chrysler was able to become the auto industry's lowest-cost producer, recording development costs that were half of the industry average by the mid-1990s.

After AMC's buyout in 1987, Chrysler insiders speculated that AMC would take over the larger firm from within. Part of the reason was that AMC's Jeep Cherokee product line alone soon accounted for more than a third of Chrysler's profits. Several AMC leaders became stars at Chrysler, including product development boss Castaing who took over Chrysler operations and engineering. He was quickly named Chrysler Motors' new vice president for Vehicle Engineering. The acquiring company was in desperate need to replicate the culture at AMC and Renault where work was conducted in an atmosphere "of constant change".

Before the purchase of AMC, Chrysler was suffering a five-year product slump after the success with its minivans that were introduced in 1984. It was mainly making K-car derivatives that looked and drove alike. Chrysler became a producer of smaller cars, thus making it vulnerable to Japanese competitors. Not only was Castaing made Chrysler's point man for fighting the Japanese automakers, but he was also called to engineer a variety of products to fit a growing number of market niches.

Castaing followed the example that was used in AMC's old Amtek technical research and product development center in Detroit. The use of these platform teams at Chrysler was first suggested by Castaing, it was the automaker's president, Robert Lutz who understood the potential of this change and had the leadership power to make it happen. Castaing realigned Chrysler's 6,000-member engineering structure into teams working on a single platforms. Lutz and Castaing reorganized their departments into AMC-style teams. Castaing also incorporated the use of simultaneous engineering. This team-management approach took shape in the late 1980s. The cross-functional teams for each vehicle were organized across all facets of company and supplier operations in bringing out new products. "I am a firm believer that teams are the way to improve," said Francois Castaing, vice president for vehicle engineering and a prime mover behind Chrysler's platform-team structure. Bob Lutz described Castaing as a great engineer who was outcome-oriented (versus process-oriented) and passionate with enthusiasm that inspired others. Lutz further reported that he is "exceptionally good constantly doing things that were accepted by the system as being impossible... he loved challenges."

At the time of AMC's buyout, Chrysler was designing the replacement for the then-new Dodge Dynasty, a mid-size car. The proposed replacement bore a direct resemblance to the existing Dynasty. However, with the purchase of AMC, a new product design system was instituted and work began by using AMC's Eagle Premier platform. According to Robert Lutz, the in-house design was scrapped entirely and the new design, under Castaing's leadership, was selected. The Chrysler LH-cars were first to use Castaing's platform approach. These new models were produced in a record 39 months, compared to other Chrysler cars that took more than 50 months. The Eagle Vision, Dodge Intrepid, Chrysler Concorde, LHS and New Yorker were all produced in AMC's state of the art Brampton Assembly plant in Brampton, Ontario, Canada that was built to make the Eagle Premier.

Castaing deservedly gets major credit for developing the all-new line of cars and trucks that paced Chrysler's surging success in the 1990s. He worked on minivan designs using the science of maximizing space usage and was praised by Chrysler's president, Bob Lutz, "as the best packager I've ever known." The success of Castaing's system was exemplified not just by the attraction of Daimler-Benz as the suitor for Chrysler, but by more than just a passing interest from General Motors and Toyota. At that time, the automaker's executives such as Robert Lutz, Thomas Stallkamp, and Francois Castaing "made Chrysler the most nimble of Detroit's three carmakers."

In 1993, Castaing founded the United States Council for Automotive Research (USCAR), joining Chrysler with General Motors and Ford. USCAR's goal is to strengthen the technology base of the U.S. auto industry through cooperative research and development. He was also instrumental in establishing the Partnership for a New Generation of Vehicles.

In 1994, Castaing became the head of Chrysler Powertrain Operations in 1996, he was appointed executive vice president for Chrysler International Operations. After the Daimler-Benz merger with Chrysler in 1998, he became a technical adviser to Bob Eaton until retirement in 2000.

He was among the creators of the sport utility vehicle trend that propelled the North American automotive industry during the 1990s and has transformed European automobile markets in the early-2000s.

Castaing was also a member in the "Dodge Viper Team", being the Engineering Vice President, and "would prove vital" to the development of the Viper's V10 engine.

Retirement
Since leaving DaimlerChrysler, Castaing has served as a member of the board of directors for multiple manufacturing and automobile companies, including Exide, the battery company, Durakon Industries, NextEnergy, Reynard Motorsport, and Valeo. He also served on the board of the Federation of American Scientists. In 2004, TRW Automotive Holdings announced the election of Castaing to the company's board of directors. He also serves on the audit committee of Amerigon (now Gentherm Incorporated).

In 1998, Castaing became chairman of the New Detroit Science Center for the education of future generations. Under his leadership, a $30 million capital campaign for the expansion and renovation of the Detroit Science Center was launched, ultimately permitting the center to reopen to the public in 2001 with dramatically expanded exhibition space. Castaing resigned from his post in January 2012, as the center closed due to various financial problems. Castaing has continued to leverage his ties to the automobile industry to promote science and engineering education.

Since 1994, Castaing has also served on the board of directors for For Inspiration and Recognition of Science and Technology (FIRST), the robotics competition for high school students created by inventor and entrepreneur Dean Kamen.

Recognition

Castaing was named "Man of the Year" by the French publication Le Journal de l'Automobile for his exemplary success in the United States. He was noted for developing the Renault-AMC structure, the launching of Renault Alliance and Encore (Renault 9 & 11), for being the father of the Jeep Cherokee (XJ), as well as being one of the craftsmen of the rescue of Chrysler.

He was elected a member of the United States National Academy of Engineering in 1995 for the development of highly reliable, high-performance automobiles and for their successful production through innovative organizational structures. Castaing was also chosen as a fellow of the Society of Automotive Engineers (SAE) that "recognizes and honors long-term members who have made a significant impact on society's mobility technology through leadership, research, and innovation."

Castaing was inducted into the Automotive Hall of Fame on 12 October 2010 in Dearborn, Michigan.

Footnotes

References
 
 
 
 
 

French automobile designers
American automobile designers
Corporate executives in the automobile industry
Auto racing people
American Motors people
Chrysler executives
Renault people
Living people
French emigrants to the United States
1945 births